Cambarus setosus, the bristly cave crayfish, is a freshwater crayfish native to Missouri and Arkansas in the United States. It is a cave-dwelling species known from 164 localities with the majority on the Springfield Plateau in southwestern Missouri.

References

Cambaridae
Cave crayfish
Freshwater crustaceans of North America
Crustaceans described in 1889
Taxa named by Walter Faxon